Assiminea grayana, common name the "dun sentinel", is a species of very small (4–6 mm.) salt marsh snail, a terrestrial (or marine gastropod mollusk in the family Assimineidae.

Habitat
This species lives in habitats that are intermediate between land and saltwater: in estuaries and salt marshes, at, or right above, the high tide level.

Description
The 5 mm high x 3 mm. wide shell is semi-transparent and  conical, with six or seven flat-sided or slightly swollen whorls and a sharp apex. It bears fine irregular growth lines and faint spiral lines but appears smooth . The  oval or ear-shaped aperture is small and has a thickened peristome. The inner lip is reflexed over the base of the last whorl. There is no umbilicus. The colour is horn or tan, often with a broad reddish band on the last whorl.

Distribution
This small snail lives in Western Europe, primarily on the southern part of the North Sea coasts, in countries and islands including:

 Great Britain
 Ireland
 The Netherlands

Reproduction
This species reproduces sexually. The male has a penis in the middle, or at least close to the middle, of his head. The female has a series of translucent glands the lead to a seminal receptacle, where an egg waits for the semen.

References

External links
 Assiminea grayana at Animalbase
 Assiminea grayana Species account and photograph at Mollusc Ireland.

Assimineidae
Gastropods described in 1828